Ethnohistory is a peer-reviewed academic journal established in 1954 and published quarterly by Duke University Press on behalf of the American Society for Ethnohistory. It publishes articles and reviews in the fields of ethnohistory, historical anthropology and social and cultural history. Like its sponsoring professional society, Ethnohistory has represented a meeting ground between scholars in the disciplines of history and anthropology. Geography and other disciplines have been increasingly represented in its pages over time. Founded by scholars focused primarily on studies of Native North America, the journal has, over its history, progressively become more global in scope.

References

Quarterly journals
Publications established in 1954
English-language journals
History journals
Ethnology journals
Anthropology journals
Duke University Press academic journals

External links